Bill Brandt (1904–1983) was a German-British photographer and photojournalist. 

William Brandt may also refer to:

Bill Brandt (baseball) (1915–1968), American baseball pitcher
William Niel Brandt (born 1970), American professor of astronomy and astrophysics
Willy Brandt (1913–1992), German politician and chancellor from 1969 to 1974
Willy Brandt (Oz), TV series character from HBO drama Oz
Willie Brandt (activist), the founder of the Revolutionary Army, a violent United States political activist group in the 1970s
William Brandt, fictional character in Mission: Impossible –  Ghost Protocol and sequel Mission: Impossible – Rogue Nation

See also
Brandt (disambiguation)